"Homecoming Queen?" (stylized in all lowercase) is a by American country pop singer Kelsea Ballerini, released on September 6, 2019, as the lead single from her third studio album Kelsea, which was released on March 20, 2020. Ballerini co-wrote the song with Jimmy Robbins and Nicolle Galyon. "Homecoming Queen?" peaked at numbers 14 and 17 on both the Hot Country Songs and Country Airplay charts respectively. It also reached number 65 on the Hot 100 chart. It was certified Platinum by the Recording Industry Association of America (RIAA), and has sold 70,000 copies as of February 2020. The song achieved similar prominence in Canada, reaching number 15 on the Country chart and number 35 on the All-Format chart. The accompanying music video for the song, directed by Shane Drake, features Ballerini in a dressing room as she goes from a glamorous image to a more stripped down look. An alternate recording of the song is also included on Ballerini's first remix album, Ballerini.

Background
In an interview with The Tennessean, Ballerini revealed that "Homecoming Queen?" – the lead single from her new album – heralded "a new, more emotionally vulnerable phase of her career," focusing on stripped down musical production and songwriting.

Commercial performance
"Homecoming Queen?" debuted at number 82 on the Billboard Hot 100 the week of September 21, 2019 before leaving the next week. It reappeared at number 89 the week of November 23 and reached number 83 until the week after. After reappearing at number 87 on the week of January 11, 2020, it reached number 76 the week of February 8. It peaked at number 65 the week of April 4, and stayed on the chart for 13 weeks. The song was certified platinum by the Recording Industry Association of America (RIAA) on May 13, 2020. It has sold 70,000 copies in the United States as of February 2020.

Music video
The music video for "Homecoming Queen?" was directed by Shane Drake and premiered on September 6, 2019. In the video, Ballerini is shown performing the song from a chair in her dressing room as the camera pans around her, as she goes "from glam to just raw and real," trading in her pink dress and full makeup that she performed in for a stripped down look without makeup.

Live performance
On March 25, 2020, Ballerini performed the song on CMT Crossroads as a duet with Halsey.

Charts

Weekly charts

Year-end charts

Certifications

References

2019 songs
2019 singles
2010s ballads
Black River Entertainment singles
Country ballads
Kelsea Ballerini songs
Music videos directed by Shane Drake
Songs written by Kelsea Ballerini
Songs written by Nicolle Galyon
Songs written by Jimmy Robbins